Fiesso is an Italian place name that may refer to:

Fiesa, Portorož, a street in the settlement of Portorož on the Adriatic coast in southwestern Slovenia
Fiesso, a former village and now a hamlet of Prato in the Municipality of Prato (Leventina), in southeastern Switzerland
 Fiesso, a frazione of Castenaso, Italy